Estrée or Estrées may refer to:

 Estrées (name), a French family name and the name of the Maison d'Estrées family (including a list of people bearing this name)
 Duke of Estrées, a title of nobility in the peerage of France that was created for the Maison d'Estrées in 1663

Places

France
 Estrées, Aisne, canton of Catelet, Saint-Quentin arrondissement, Aisne department, Picardy region
 Estrées, Nord, canton of Arleux, Douai arrondissement, Nord department, Nord-Pas-de-Calais region
 Estrées-Deniécourt, in the Somme department
 Estrées-la-Campagne, in the Calvados department
 Estrées-lès-Crécy, in the Somme department
 Estrées-Mons, in the Somme department
 Estrées-Saint-Denis, in the Oise department
 Estrées-sur-Noye, in the Somme department
 Estrée, in the Pas-de-Calais department
 Estrée-Blanche, in the Pas-de-Calais department
 Estrée-Cauchy, in the Pas-de-Calais department
 Estrée-Wamin, in the Pas-de-Calais department
 Mesnil-sur-l'Estrée, in the Eure department

Elsewhere
 D'Estrees Bay, a bay on the southern coast of Kangaroo Island, Australia 
D'Estrees Bay, South Australia, a locality
 Fort d'Estrées, fort named after Jean II d'Estrées which now houses the Historical Museum of Senegal on Gorée island, Senegal

In literature
 Estrées,  a town extensively described in Ch. XXI of André Maurois' "The Silences of Colonel Bramble" and which may or may not refer to one of the actual places so named.

Other uses
, a pair of protected cruisers built for the French Navy